Edmund Levi Pitts (May 23, 1839 – July 11, 1898) was an American lawyer and politician who served as a member of the New York State Assembly and New York State Senate.

Early life and education
Pitts was born in Yates, New York, the son of John M. Pitts (1814–1907) and Mary Ann Clark Pitts (1820–1873). He was educated at Yates Academy, then studied law with Sanford E. Church at Albion, New York, and graduated from the State and National Law School in Ballston Spa, New York in 1860.

Career 
He was a member of the New York State Assembly in 1864, 1865, 1866, 1867 and 1868. In 1867, he was chosen Speaker of the New York State Assembly, at the age of 27 the youngest man ever to hold this office. He was a delegate to the 1868 Republican National Convention.

From May 1870 to June 1873, he was an Assessor of United States Revenue for Orleans County.

He was a member of the New York State Senate (29th D.) from 1880 to 1883, sitting in the 103rd, 104th, 105th and 106th New York State Legislatures. In May 1881, when Roscoe Conkling and Thomas C. Platt resigned their seats in the United States Senate, he opposed firmly their re-election. He was a delegate to the 1884 Republican National Convention.

He was again a member of the State Senate in 1886 and 1887, and was President pro tempore.

Personal life 
He married Una E. Stokes (1843–1920) on December 9, 1862. Their only child was Grace M. Pitts (1867–1900). Pitts died in Medina, New York. He was buried at Boxwood Cemetery in Ridgeway, New York.

Sources
 Speaker election, NYT on January 3, 1867
 Nomination for re-election to the State Senate, in NYT on September 30, 1881
 Chosen as Pres. pro tem of State Senate, in NYT on January 5, 1886
 His father's and wfe's obits, at Rootsweb
 List of burials at Boxwood Cemetery, at Rootsweb
 His obit in NYT on July 12, 1898

1839 births
1898 deaths
Speakers of the New York State Assembly
Republican Party members of the New York State Assembly
Republican Party New York (state) state senators
Majority leaders of the New York State Senate
People from Yates, New York
People from Medina, New York
People from Ridgeway, New York
19th-century American politicians